The American daily newspaper The New York Times publishes multiple weekly list ranking the best selling books in the United States. The lists are split in three genres—fiction, nonfiction and children's books. Both the fiction and nonfiction lists are further split into multiple lists.

Fiction
The following list ranks the best selling fiction books, in the combined print and e-books category. The most frequent weekly best seller of the year was The Girl on the Train by Paula Hawkins with 10 weeks at the top of the list, followed by Me Before You by Jojo Moyes with 7 weeks.

Nonfiction
The following list ranks the best selling nonfiction books, in the combined print and e-books category. The most frequent weekly best seller of the year was When Breath Becomes Air by Paul Kalanithi with 13 weeks at the top of the list, followed by Killing the Rising Sun with nine weeks.

See also
 Publishers Weekly list of bestselling novels in the United States in the 2010s

References

2016
.
New York Times best sellers
New York Times best sellers
New York Times best sellers